Ali Yasser Akra (born January 2, 1985 in Lattakia, Syria) is a Syrian footballer. He currently plays for Bahrain SC.

References

External links
 Career stats at goalzz.com

1985 births
Living people
Syrian footballers
Syrian expatriate footballers
Expatriate footballers in Bahrain
Expatriate footballers in Jordan
Syrian expatriate sportspeople in Bahrain
Syrian expatriate sportspeople in Jordan
Association football midfielders
Syrian Premier League players